Fancy Lake Water Aerodrome  was located  south southwest of Fancy Lake, Nova Scotia, Canada. The airport was listed as abandoned in the 15 March 2007 Canada Flight Supplement.

References

Defunct seaplane bases in Nova Scotia
Transport in Lunenburg County, Nova Scotia
Buildings and structures in Lunenburg County, Nova Scotia